The Narada Falls Comfort Station was built in Mount Rainier National Park by the National Park Service and the Civilian Conservation Corps in 1941–42. The public toilet building is close to Narada Falls in the south central portion of the park. Initial work by the Park Service encountered substantial rock excavation, with the subsequent cost overrun requiring the Park Service to use CCC labor to complete the project. The building features stone masonry walls to window sill level, woor framed upper walls, and a timber framed roof. The interior comprises a waiting room and a toilet facility. The design was by the Western Region Landscape Engineering Division, with plan approval by Thomas Chalmers Vint, NPS Chief of Planning.

The building was placed on the National Register of Historic Places on March 13, 1991. It is part of the Mount Rainier National Historic Landmark District, which encompasses the entire park and which recognizes the park's inventory of Park Service-designed rustic architecture.

References

Park buildings and structures on the National Register of Historic Places in Washington (state)
Government buildings completed in 1942
Buildings and structures in Lewis County, Washington
Rustic architecture in Washington (state)
Buildings and structures in Mount Rainier National Park
Civilian Conservation Corps in Washington (state)
Restrooms in the United States
1942 establishments in Washington (state)
National Register of Historic Places in Mount Rainier National Park